Imani Vol. 1 is the fourth and final studio album by American hip hop duo Blackalicious. It was released on September 18, 2015.

Critical reception

At Metacritic, which assigns a weighted average score out of 100 to reviews from mainstream critics, the album received an average score of 75, based on 7 reviews, indicating "generally favorable reviews".

Track listing

Charts

References

External links
 
 

2015 albums
Blackalicious albums
Quannum Projects albums